Zhao Gongming, also known as Zhao Gong Yuanshuai , is the martial god of wealth in Chinese folk religion. Zhao Gongming is the most notable among various forms of Caishen, and his birthday is commemorated on the fifth day of the first lunar month. He appears for the first time in the classic Chinese novel, Fengshen Yanyi (封神演义), contrary to claims in Pochu Mixin Quanshu that he was a creation of the Song era.

Legends

Sanjiao Soushen Daquan
According to the religious compendium, Sanjiao Soushen Daquan, Zhao Gongming lived during the late Warring States period. When the King of Qin founded the Qin empire he withdrew to Mount Zhongnan which is located in present-day Shaanxi Province in Northwest China. There he cultivated Tao and attained the highest state of spiritual enlightenment. During the Eastern Han Dynasty, Zhang Tianshi practiced the art of making pills of immortality and asked the Jade Emperor to send a god to protect him. The Jade Emperor sent Zhao Gongming and conferred upon Zhao the title of "Zhengyi Xuantan Marshal". After this, he became known as "Zhao Xuan." He was said to have the ability to control thunder and lightning, ward off plagues and disasters, and generate wealth and treasure.

Fengshen Yanyi
In Fengshen Yanyi, Zhao Gongming was a Taoist hermit with magical powers who was a close friend of General Wen Zhong. Through Wen Zhong, King Zhou of Shang was able to engage the help of Zhao Gongming. Zhao was killed when fighting Jiang Ziya who was helping the Zhou overthrow the Shang. Zhao Gongming's three younger sisters Zhao Yunxiao, Zhao Qiongxiao, and Zhao Bixiao were also killed by Jiang Ziya during the war. 

Later, during a visit to the temple of Yuan Shi, Jiang was rebuked for causing Zhao Gongming's death. As ordered, Jiang carried Zhao's corpse into the temple, apologized for his misdeed, extolled Zhao's virtues, and deified Zhao Gongming as the Genuine God of the Profound Dragon Tiger Altar. 

As a deity, Zhao's duties are to bring the blessings of auspicious happiness and chase criminals away. Zhao Gongming has four assistant gods: Chen Jiugong, the god of attracting wealth; Xiao Sheng, the god of collecting treasures; Cao Bao, the god of collecting valuables; and Yao Shaosi, the god of profitability. He and his four disciples are also known as the "five directions" of the Chinese gods of wealth.

References

Chinese gods
Investiture of the Gods characters
Deities in Taoism